This article lists the main weightlifting events and their results for 2009.

World weightlifting championships
 May 19 – ?: 2009 World Youth Weightlifting Championships in  Chiang Mai
  won both the gold and overall medal tallies.
 June 14 – ?: 2009 World Junior Weightlifting Championships in  Bucharest
  won both the gold and overall medal tallies.
 November 19 – 29: 2009 World Weightlifting Championships in  Goyang
  won both the gold and overall medal tallies.

Continental & regional weightlifting championships
 March 18 – ?: 2009 European Union Weightlifting Championships in  Ciechanów
 Men's 56 kg winner:  Maciej Przepiórkiewicz
 Men's 62 kg winner:  Damian Wisniewski
 Men's 69 kg winner:  Isaac Julian Morillas Sanchez
 Men's 77 kg winner:  Roman Klis
 Women's 48 kg winner:  María Cabrera
 Women's 53 kg winner:  Marzena Karpińska
 Women's 58 kg winner:  Joanna Łochowska
 Women's 63 kg winner:  Sheila Ramos Gonzalez
 April 4 – ?: 2009 European Weightlifting Championships in  Bucharest
  won both the gold and overall medal tallies.
 May 9 – ?: 2009 Asian Weightlifting Championships in  Taldıqorğan
  won both the gold and overall medal tallies.
 May 12 – ?: 2009 Oceania Senior & Junior Weightlifting Championships in  Darwin
 Senior:  won both the gold and overall medal tallies.
 Junior:  won both the gold and overall medal tallies.
 June 3 – ?: 2009 Pan American Weightlifting Championships in  Chicago
  won both the gold and overall medal tallies.
 July 1 – ?: 2009 GCC Senior & Junior Weightlifting Championships in  Fujairah
 Senior (Men only):  won both the gold and overall medal tallies.
 Junior (Men only):  won the gold medal tally. Saudi Arabia and  won 8 overall medals each.
 July 25 – ?: 2009 European Junior Weightlifting Championships in  Landskrona
  and  won 3 gold medals each.  won the overall medal tally.
 July 31 – ?: 2009 African Senior, Junior, & Youth Weightlifting Championships in  Kampala
 Senior:  won the gold medal tally.  won the overall medal tally.
Cameroon, Egypt, South Africa, and  won 6 overall medals each.
 Youth:  won both the gold and overall medal tallies.
 September 6 – ?: 2009 European Youth Weightlifting Championships in  Eilat
  won both the gold and overall medal tallies.
 October 11 – ?: 2009 European U23 Weightlifting Championships in  Władysławowo
  won the gold medal tally.  won the overall medal tally.
 October 19 – ?: 2009 Commonwealth Senior & Junior Weightlifting Championships in  Penang
 Senior:  won both the gold and overall medal tallies.
 Junior:  won both the gold and overall medal tallies.
 October 20 – ?: 2009 Pan American Youth Weightlifting Championships in 
  won both the gold and overall medal tallies.
 December 16 – ?: 2009 Asian Junior Weightlifting Championships in  Dubai
  won both the gold and overall medal tallies.

References

External links
 International Weightlifting Federation Website

 
Weightlifting by year
2009 in sports